Huhana (or Hūhana) is a Māori feminine given name, equivalent to the English name Susan. Notable people with the name include:

 Huhana Hickey, New Zealand Māori lawyer and disability advocate
 Huhana Smith (born 1962), New Zealand Māori artist and academic
 Huhana Susana Tetane Lemisio (born 1945), Tokelauan community organiser and educator